Tristen Hoge (born May 23, 1997) is an American football offensive guard who is a free agent. He played college football at Brigham Young from 2017 to 2020. He previously attended Notre Dame.

High school
Hoge attended Highland High School where he was a highly-touted offensive lineman and won the Gatorade Player of the Year award twice for Idaho. He was ranked as the number one center in the nation. Hoge was also named to the 2014 American First-team and played in the 2015 U.S. Army All-American Bowl.

College career
Hoge received offers from Stanford, Florida, Penn State, Michigan State, LSU, Boise State and BYU, before committing to Notre Dame. He played two years at Notre Dame and was chosen as the 2015 Notre Dame Offensive Scout Team Player of the Year, before playing six games in 2016.

Hoge transferred to BYU in 2017 and had to sit out the year due to NCAA transfer rules. He would go on to play in and start 13 games at right guard, but only managed 5 games in 2019 due to a leg injury. Unfortunately, Hoge contracted COVID-19 and pneumonia, limiting him to 8 games in 2020.

Professional career

New York Jets
After going undrafted in the 2021 NFL Draft, Hoge signed with the New York Jets on May 7, 2021. Hoge was waived by the Jets on August 24, 2021.

Cleveland Browns
Hoge was signed to the Cleveland Browns practice squad on September 20, 2021. He was released on December 7.

Denver Broncos
On December 28, 2021, Hoge was signed to the Denver Broncos practice squad.

Personal life
Hoge is the nephew of former Pittsburgh Steelers running back and ESPN analyst Merril Hoge. He is also cousin to former BYU quarterback Beau Hoge, who played from 2015 and 2018.

References

External links
BYU Cougars bio
New York Jets bio

1997 births
Living people
American football offensive guards
BYU Cougars football players
Notre Dame Fighting Irish football players
Players of American football from Idaho
Sportspeople from Pocatello, Idaho
All-American college football players
New York Jets players
Cleveland Browns players
Denver Broncos players